Paul de Nourquer du Camper was Governor General for Inde française in the Second French Colonial Empire during the July Monarchy. During his period an annual statistics manual was written by Pierre Constant Sicé in 1842, which describes and narrates various situations in Inde française.

Titles Held

See also
 European and American voyages of scientific exploration

French colonial governors and administrators
Governors of French India
Governors of French Guiana
People of the July Monarchy
Year of birth missing
Year of death missing